Mixed martial arts in the United Kingdom is one of the fastest growing sports thanks to the promotion of the UFC.

History

UFC 38 was one the earliest entries of MMA in the United Kingdom on July 13, 2002 at Royal Albert Hall. 

Michael Bisping became the first UK UFC champion. In 2022 Brendan Loughnane become only the fourth Briton to win a World MMA title with a major organisation after Liam McGeary and Leon Edwards.

Domestic Organizations

The major organizations for MMA are Cage Warriors, UCMMA and Full Contact Contender

Television

The UFC is broadcast on BT Sport. The PFL is broadcast on Channel 4 as of 2022. Bellator MMA is broadcast on Channel 5.

References